Rhododendron annae (桃叶杜鹃) is a species of flowering plant in the heath family Ericaceae, native to central and western Guizhou and western Yunnan, China, where it grows at altitudes of . This evergreen shrub grows to 1.5– in height, with leathery leaves that are narrow elongate-lanceolate to oblong-elliptic, 7–10 by 2–3.7 cm in size. The campanulate flowers are predominantly white, but may be flushed or spotted with pink.

References

External links
 "Rhododendron annae", Franchet, J. Bot. (Morot). 12: 258. 1898.

annae